William Janney (born Russell Dixon Janney, February 15, 1908 – December 22, 1992) was an American actor who appeared in 39 films between 1929 and 1937.

He was the son of author and theatrical producer Russell Janney, and he attended the School for Professional Children.

Janney debuted on Broadway in Merton of the Movies (1922). His other Broadway credits include Great Music (1924) Four O'Clock (1933), Take My Tip (1932), Tommy (1927), and Bridge of Distances (1925).

His biggest regret was not taking the role in Tol'able David (1930) after Columbia boss Harry Cohn offered it to him. His mother urged him to let Richard Cromwell have it. "She told me there was this old woman friend of hers whose son had always wanted to play the part. She said I didn't want to play it anyway. To this day, I don't understand her... This really spoiled the whole thing for me, because I might have been offered a contract with Columbia. As it turned out, I never did get a contract, and Harry Cohn never offered me anything else."

Complete filmography

Coquette (1929) - Jimmy Besant
Salute (1929) - Midshipman Paul Randall
Mexicali Rose (1929) - Bob Manning
The Girl Said No (1930) - Jimmie Ward
Those Who Dance (1930) - Tim Brady
Young Desire (1930) - Bobby Spencer
The Dawn Patrol (1930) - Gordon Scott
Shooting Straight (1930) - Tommy Powell
The Pay-Off (1930) - Tommy Brown
Cimarron (1931) - Man Phoning Ambulance (uncredited)
The Right of Way (1931) - Billy Wantage
Girls Demand Excitement (1931) - Freddie
Parents Wanted (1931, Short)
 Meet the Wife (1931) - Gregory Brown
The Man Who Played God (1932) - First Boy
The Mouthpiece (1932) - John 'Johnny' Morris
Two Seconds (1932) - College Boy at Execution
Crooner (1932) - Pat - Band Member
A Successful Calamity (1932) - Eddie Wilton
Under-Cover Man (1932) - Jimmy Madigan
The Iron Master (1933) - David Stillman
The Crime of the Century (1933) - Jim Brandt
Terror Aboard (1933) - Edward Wilson
Secret of the Blue Room (1933) - Thomas Brandt
King of the Wild Horses (1933) - Two Feathers
The World Changes (1933) - Orin Nordholm III
Should Ladies Behave (1933) - Geoffrey Cole
As the Earth Turns (1934) - Ollie
A Modern Hero (1934) - Young Pierre Croy
A Successful Failure (1934) - Robert Cushing
Sweepstake Annie (1935) - Arthur Foster
The Great Hotel Murder (1935) - Harry Prentice
Without Children (1935) - David Sonny Cole Jr.
Born to Gamble (1935) - Fred Mathews
Bonnie Scotland (1935) - Allan Douglas
Sutter's Gold (1936) - John Sutter Jr.
Sitting on the Moon (1936) - Young Husband
Hopalong Cassidy Returns (1936) - Buddy Cassidy
Clipped Wings (1937) - Mickey Lofton (final film role)

References

External links

1908 births
1992 deaths
American male film actors
Male actors from New York City
20th-century American male actors